Hondonadia is an extinct genus of Late Eocene to Early Oligocene (Tinguirirican) marsupials related to today's shrew opossums and with similar features as the related Rosendolops. The type species Hondonadia feruglioi was described by Goin and Candela in 1998. In later years, five more species were recognized, of which Pascualdelphys fierroensis, described by Flynn and Wyss in 1999, that was in 2010 synonymized with Hondonadia.

Description 
The species H. feruglioi and H. praecipitia were possibly larger. Its main diet probably consisted of seeds rather than insects. The type species Hondonadia feruglioi preserves at least four upper incisors (of which the posteriormost is the smallest), but the presence of five teeth cannot be ruled out. H. feruglioi also preserves a very large, subvertical C1.

Fossil distribution 
Fossils of the genus were found in the Tinguiririca fauna of the Abanico Formation of Chile, the Santa Rosa local fauna of the Yahuarango Formation in Amazonian Peru and in the Gran Barranca fauna of the Vera Member pertaining to the Sarmiento Formation in Argentina.

References

Bibliography 

 
 
  
 
 

Prehistoric marsupial genera
Eocene marsupials
Oligocene marsupials
Eocene mammals of South America
Oligocene mammals of South America
Priabonian life
Rupelian life
Tinguirirican
Paleogene Argentina
Fossils of Argentina
Golfo San Jorge Basin
Paleogene Chile
Fossils of Chile
Paleogene Peru
Fossils of Peru
Fossil taxa described in 1998
Taxa named by Francisco J. Goin
Sarmiento Formation